In college football, 2012 NCAA football bowl games may refer to:

2011–12 NCAA football bowl games, for games played in January 2012 as part of the 2011 season.
2012–13 NCAA football bowl games, for games played in December 2012 as part of the 2012 season.